Events in the year 1972 in Mexico.

Incumbents

Federal government
 President: Luis Echeverría
 Interior Secretary (SEGOB): Mario Moya Palencia
 Secretary of Foreign Affairs (SRE): Emilio Óscar Rabasa
 Communications Secretary (SCT): Eugenio Méndez Docurro
 Education Secretary (SEP): Víctor Bravo Ahuja
 Secretary of Defense (SEDENA): Matías Ramos
 Secretary of Navy: Luis M. Bravo Carrera
 Secretary of Labor and Social Welfare: Rafael Hernández Ochoa/Porfirio Muñoz Ledo
 Secretary of Welfare: Luis Enrique Bracamontes

Supreme Court

 President of the Supreme Court: Alfonso Guzmán Neyra

Governors

 Aguascalientes: Francisco Guel Jiménez
 Baja California: Milton Castellanos Everardo
 Campeche: Carlos Sansores Pérez
 Chiapas: Manuel Velasco Suárez
 Chihuahua: Oscar Flores Sánchez
 Coahuila: Eulalio Gutiérrez Treviño
 Colima: Pablo Silva García
 Durango: Alejandro Páez Urquidi 
 Guanajuato: Manuel M. Moreno
 Guerrero: Israel Nogueda Otero
 Hidalgo: Donaciano Serna Leal/Manuel Sánchez Vite
 Jalisco: Alberto Orozco Romero
 State of Mexico: Carlos Hank González 
 Michoacán: Servando Chávez Hernández
 Morelos: Felipe Rivera Crespo
 Nayarit: Roberto Gómez Reyes
 Nuevo León: Luis M. Farías
 Oaxaca: Fernando Gómez Sandoval
 Puebla: Rafael Moreno Valle
 Querétaro: Juventino Castro Sánchez
 San Luis Potosí: Antonio Rocha Cordero
 Sinaloa: Alfredo Valdés Montoya
 Sonora: Faustino Félix Serna
 Tabasco: Mario Trujillo García
 Tamaulipas: Manuel A. Rabize	
 Tlaxcala: Luciano Huerta Sánchez
 Veracruz: Rafael Murillo Vidal
 Yucatán: Carlos Loret de Mola Mediz
 Zacatecas: Pedro Ruiz González
Regent of Mexico City: Octavio Senties Gomez

Events
 
 José Guadalupe Posada Museum opens.  
 The Palace of Iturbide becomes the home of the Banamex Cultural Foundation (Fomento Cultural Banamex). 
 The Festival Internacional Cervantino is founded in Guanajuato.
 June 14–23: Hurricane Agnes. 
 September: Fred Gómez Carrasco is arrested in Guadalajara. 
 September 30-October 7: Hurricane Joanne

Awards
Belisario Domínguez Medal of Honor – Ignacio Ramos Praslow

Births
January 25 – Chantal Andere, actress
January 27 – Bibi Gaytán, Mexican singer and actress
April 23 – Patricia Manterola, actress, fashion designer, singer, and model
May 10 – Víctor Noriega, actor, singer, and model
June 22 – Miguel del Toro, baseball player
August 30 – José Ramón Amieva, acting Mayor of Mexico City 2018
October 23 – Kate del Castillo, television actress (La Reina del Sur)
October 23 – Dominika Paleta, Polish-Mexican actress
November 27 – Ivonne Ortega Pacheco, politician (PRI); first elected female Governor of Yucatán 2007–2012
December 25 – Ricardo Tejedo, actor, voice actor, ADR director, script writer and translator
December 26 – Ricardo Tejedo, actor, voice actor, ADR director, script writer and translator
Date unknown – Marbella Ibarra, soccer coach and promoter of women's soccer (d. October 12, 2018).

Deaths
December 7 – Humberto Mariles, equestrian Olympic gold medalist

Film

 List of Mexican films of 1972.

Sport

 1971–72 Mexican Primera División season.
 Cafeteros de Córdoba win the Mexican League. 
 Mexico at the 1972 Summer Olympics.
 Mexico at the 1972 Summer Paralympics. 
 The Adecmac soccer league is founded.

References

External links

 
Mexico